Cape Town Shuffle is an album by American jazz saxophonist Ernest Dawkins' New Horizons Ensemble, which was recorded live at Chicago's HotHouse in 2002 and released on Delmark.

Music
"Toucouleur", named after a Senegalese tribe, was developed in 2000 when Dawkins started his partnership with the Montu Dance Theater of Chicago. "Third Line and the Cape Town Shuffle" features the Southern-Baptist-style preaching of New Horizons Ensemble member Ameen Muhammad. "Dolphy and the Monk Dance" is a tribute to saxophonist Vandy Harris. "Jazz to Hip Hop" is a scale-down sextet version from Dawkins' involvement in the Meet the Composers Residency and features the lyrics of Khari B. the Disco Poet, son of Mwata Bowden.

Reception

In his review for AllMusic, Alex Henderson states "Cape Town Shuffle isn't for bop snobs, but those who appreciate an inside/outside approach to avant-garde jazz will find these performances to be quite enriching."

The All About Jazz review by Mark Corroto says "That is butt-shakin' blues based jazz. Like Charles Mingus recalling the field hollers, the Art Ensemble of Chicago bringing the beat straight out of Africa, and Dizzy Gillespie spinning into new heights with bebop, Dawkins stirs his listeners to get up and move."

In his review for JazzTimes,  states "The music of New Horizons spills over with vibrant energies, conveying the life-affirming exuberance of cultural expression."

Track listing
All compositions by Ernest Dawkins
 "Toucouler" – 14:00
 "Third Line and the Cape Town Shuffle" – 19:48 
 "Dolphy and the Monk Dance" – 14:07 
 "Jazz to Hip Hop" (Words: Khari B.) – 14:18

Personnel
Ernest Dawkins - alto sax, tenor sax
Ameen Muhammad – trumpet
Steve Berry – trombone
Darius Savage – bass
Avreeayl Ra – drums
Khari B. – poetry on 4

References

2003 live albums
Ernest Dawkins live albums
Delmark Records live albums